The galanin receptor is a G protein-coupled receptor, or metabotropic receptor which binds galanin.

Galanin receptors can be found throughout the peripheral and central nervous systems and the endocrine system. So far three subtypes are known to exist: GAL-R1, GAL-R2, and GAL-R3. The specific function of each subtype remains to be fully elucidated, although as of 2009 great progress is currently being made in this respect with the generation of receptor subtype-specific knockout mice, and the first selective ligands for galanin receptor subtypes. Selective galanin agonists are anticonvulsant, while antagonists produce antidepressant and anxiolytic effects in animals, so either agonist or antagonist ligands for the galanin receptors may be potentially therapeutic compounds in humans.

Ligands

Agonists
Non-selective
 Galanin
 Galanin 1-15 fragment
 Galanin-like peptide - agonist at GAL1 and GAL2 but not GAL3
 Galmic
 Galnon
 NAX 5055
 D-Gal(7-Ahp)-B2

GAL1 selective
 M617

 
GAL1/2 selective
 M1154 - has no GalR3 interaction

GAL2 selective
 Galanin 2-11 amide - also called AR-M 1896, anticonvulsant in mice, CAS# 367518-31-8
 M1145 - selective compared to both GalR1 and GalR3 
 M1153 - selective compared to both GalR1 and GalR3
 CYM 2503 (positive allosteric modulator)

Antagonists
Non-selective
 M35 peptide

GAL1 selective
 SCH-202,596

GAL2 selective
 M871 peptide

GAL3 selective
 SNAP-37889
 SNAP-398,299

References

External links

 

G protein-coupled receptors